Ryan Russell may refer to:

 Ryan Russell (American football) (born 1992), American NFL player
 Ryan Russell (ice hockey) (born 1987), Canadian ice hockey player
 Ryan Russell (tennis) (born 1983), Jamaican tennis player